Second River may refer to:

Second River (Michigan), a river in Michigan
Second River (New Jersey), a tributary of the Passaic River in New Jersey
Second River, the original name for the town of Belleville, New Jersey